Amenia is an unincorporated community in Piatt County, in the U.S. state of Illinois.

The community was named after Amenia, New York, the native home of an early settler.

References

Unincorporated communities in Piatt County, Illinois
Unincorporated communities in Illinois